The Anclote Missile Tracking Annex was a Cold War radar station of  in Pasco County, Florida adjacent to the Alachua Pinellas community at the mouth of the Anclote River near Tampa.  The Air Force Systems Command military installation, site D 3 of the Eglin Range Complex, was used for development tests, e.g., 1950s/1960s Regulus II supersonic cruise missile firings from the Venice missile launch complex.

The Anclote site "phased down" May 1-July 1, 1969.

References

Radar stations of the United States Air Force
Military installations closed in 1969
Installations of the United States Air Force in Florida
Pasco County, Florida
1969 disestablishments in Florida